= United Kingdom Haemophilia Centre Doctors' Organisation =

Medical organisation

The United Kingdom Haemophilia Centre Doctors' Organisation before 1993 was known as the United Kingdom Haemophilia Centre Directors Organisation.

The organisation is required by the Department of Health to collect data on Haemophiliacs throughout the UK; this information is stored on the National Haemophilia Database which is managed and run by UKHCDO.
